The 451st Flying Training Squadron is an active United States Air Force unit. Its assigned to the 479th Flying Training Group, stationed at NAS Pensacola, Florida.

History

World War II

Established as a Martin B-26 Marauder medium bomber squadron in mid-1942; trained under Third Air Force in Florida. Deployed to European Theater of Operations, being assigned to VIII Bomber Command 3d Bombardment Wing in England. Engaged in attacks on enemy targets in France and the Low Countries; being reassigned to IX Bomber Command in 1943 with the establishment of Ninth Air Force in England. Also supported VIII Bomber Command strategic bombardment raids in Occupied Europe and Nazi Germany, attacking enemy airfields to disrupt interceptor attacks on heavy bomber formations and destroy enemy interceptor aircraft on the ground before they could be launched.

After D-Day deployed to Advanced Landing Grounds in France and later Belgium. Provided tactical air support and bombardment of enemy strong points and military targets to disrupt resistance to Allied ground forces advancing from the French invasion beaches and the ensuing offensives on the continent; 1944–1945. Attacked enemy forces as part of the Western Allied invasion of Germany, 1945 and continued offensive tactical operations in support of ground forces until German capitulation in May 1945.

Became part of the United States Air Forces in Europe army of occupation in Germany during 1945. Demobilized in place and personnel returned to the United States in the fall of 1945; squadron inactivated as a paper unit in December 1945.

Air Force reserve
Reactivated as a reserve air training command squadron; assigned and performed advanced flight training for air cadets, 1947–1949. Inactivated due to funding restrictions.

Day fighter operations
Assigned to Tactical Air Command and reactivated in 1954 flying North American F-86 Sabres; later North American F-100 Super Sabres as a fighter-day squadron. Inactivated in 1957 due to funding restrictions.

Flying training
Reactivated in 1972 as an Air Training Command navigator training squadron; flew Convair T-29; later Boeing T-43 Bobcat navigation classroom aircraft.

As of 2 October 2009, the 451st FTS trains Combat Systems Officers utilizing 21 modified T-1A Jayhawk aircraft.

Lineage
 Constituted as the 451st Bombardment Squadron (Medium) on 19 June 1942
 Activated on 17 July 1942
 Redesignated 451st Bombardment Squadron, Medium on 20 August 1943
 Inactivated on 11 December 1945
 Redesignated 451st Bombardment Squadron, Light on 3 July 1947
 Activated in the reserve on 9 August 1947
 Inactivated on 27 June 1949
 Redesignated 451st Fighter-Day Squadron on 24 March 1954
 Activated on 1 July 1954
 Inactivated on 18 November 1957.
 Redesignated 451st Flying Training Squadron on 28 July 1972
 Activated on 1 April 1973
 Inactivated on 31 May 1993
 Activated on 2 October 2009

Assignments
 322d Bombardment Group, 17 July 1942 – 11 December 1945
 322d Bombardment Group, 9 August 1947 – 27 June 1949
 322d Fighter-Day Group, 1 July 1954 – 18 November 1957
 323d Flying Training Wing, 1 April 1973
 323d Operations Group, 15 December 1991 – 31 May 1993
 479th Flying Training Group, 2 October 2009 – present

Stations
 MacDill Field, Florida, 17 July 1942
 Drane Field, Florida, 22 September-15 November 1942
 RAF Rattlesden (AAF-126), England, 1 December 1942
 RAF Bury St Edmunds (Rougham) (AAF-468), England, 22 March 1943
 RAF Great Saling (later Andrews Field) (AAF-485), England, 12 June 1943
 Beauvais/Tille Airfield (A-61), France, c. 29 September 1944
 Le Culot Airfield (A-89), Belgium, c. 26 March 1945
 Arolsen, Germany, July 1945
 Clastres Airfield, France, c. 1 October-3 December 1945
 Camp Kilmer, New Jersey, 9–11 December 1945
 Reading AAFld (later, Muni Aprt), Pennsylvania, 9 August 1947 – 27 June 1949
 Foster Air Force Base, Texas, 1 July 1954 – 18 November 1957
 Deployed to Landstuhl Air Base, West Germany, 20 September-4 October 1956
 Mather Air Force Base, California, 1 April 1973 – 31 May 1993
 Naval Air Station Pensacola, Florida, 2 October 2009 – present

Aircraft

 Martin B-26 Marauder (1942–1945)
 North American AT-6 Texan (1947–1949)
 Beechcraft AT-7 Navigator (1947–1949)
 Beechcraft AT-11 Kansan (1947–1949)
 North American F-86 Sabre (1954–1955)
 North American F-100 Super Sabre (1955–1957)
 Convair T-29 Flying Classroom (1973–1975)
 Boeing T-43 Bobcat (1973–1993)
 Raytheon T-1A Jayhawk (2009–present)

References

 Notes

External links
American Air Museum in Britain – 451st Bomb Squadron
American Battle Monuments Commission.gov
Historical Marker Database
B26.com – Calendar of Activities 351st Bomb Squadron

Bibliography

 
 
 
 
 
 

0451